Following are the results of the team technical routine synchronised swimming competition at the 2009 World Aquatics Championships held in Rome, Italy from July 17 to August 2, 2009.

Medalist

Results

Green denotes finalists

External links
Preliminary Results
Final Results

Synchronised swimming at the 2009 World Aquatics Championships